Monte Frontè is a mountain in Liguria, northern Italy, part of the Alps.  It is located in the province of province of Imperia. It lies at an altitude of 2,152 metres. After Monte Saccarello it is the second highest peak in the  Ligurian region.

Geography 
Monte Frontè is located on the main chain of the Alps between Tanaro, Arroscia and Argentina valleys, and is divided from the neighbouring Cima Garlenda by Passo Frontè (2088 m).

SOIUSA classification 

According to the SOIUSA (International Standardized Mountain Subdivision of the Alps) the mountain can be classified in the following way:
 main part = Western Alps
 major sector =  South Western Alps
 section = Ligurian Alps
 subsection = Alpi del Marguareis
 supergroup = Catena del Saccarello
 group = Gruppo del Monte Saccarello
 subgroup = Nodo del Monte Saccarello
 code = I/A-1.II-A.1.a

Hiking 
The mountain is accessible by mountain tracks starting from the Alta Via dei Monti Liguri, a long-distance trail from Ventimiglia (province of Imperia) to Bolano (province of La Spezia).

Conservation 
Since 2007, the southern side of the mountain has been included in the Parco naturale regionale delle Alpi Liguri.

Mountain huts 
 Rifugio Sanremo (2,054 m)

See also

 Passo Frontè

References

External links
Official website of the province of Imperia

Mountains of the Ligurian Alps
Mountains of Liguria
Two-thousanders of Italy